KGLH may refer to:

 Mid Delta Regional Airport (ICAO code KGLH)
 KGLH-LP, a low-power radio station (96.9 FM) licensed to Spicer, Minnesota, United States